Albert Maack House is a historic home located at Crown Point, Lake County, Indiana, United States.  It was built in 1913, and is a -story, Tudor Revival style brick dwelling with a cross gable roof sheathed in clay tile.  It features stucco walls with exposed timbers on the gables, cut stone window sills, and leaded, stained glass windows.

It was listed in the National Register of Historic Places in 2010.

References

Houses on the National Register of Historic Places in Indiana
Tudor Revival architecture in Indiana
Houses completed in 1913
Buildings and structures in Lake County, Indiana
National Register of Historic Places in Lake County, Indiana